Industrial Gothic is a five-issue comic book limited series written and illustrated by Ted McKeever. It was published in 1995 by Vertigo, edited by Lou Stathis.

Story 
Pencil and Nickel are two inmates of a prison in a dystopian society in which ugliness is a crime. Pencil was born in the prison; Nickel is incarcerated there because she has no arms or legs. They decide to escape, in order to find a semi-mythical place called The Aluminium Tower, in which everyone is accepted no matter what they look like.

References

 
 

1995 comics debuts